Enteromius foutensis is a species of ray-finned fish in the genus Enteromius. It has been found in the Little Scarcies River that flows through Guinea and Sierra Leone.

References

External links 
 

Enteromius
Taxa named by Christian Lévêque
Taxa named by Guy G. Teugels
Taxa named by Thys van den Audenaerde
Fish described in 1988

Fish of Africa